Tsaghkavan may refer to these two places in the Tavush Province:

Tsaghkavan, Armenia
Verin Tsaghkavan, Armenia